Between 2010 and 2012, four Iranian nuclear scientists (Masoud Alimohammadi, Majid Shahriari, Darioush Rezaeinejad and Mostafa Ahmadi Roshan) were assassinated, while another (Fereydoon Abbasi) was wounded in an attempted murder. In November 2020, another scientist (Mohsen Fakhrizadeh) was assassinated.

Two of the killings were carried out with magnetic bombs attached to the targets' cars; Darioush Rezaeinejad was shot dead, and Masoud Alimohammadi was killed in a motorcycle-bomb explosion. The Iranian government accused Israel of complicity in the killings. In 2011 and 2012, Iranian authorities arrested a number of Iranians alleged to have carried out the assassination campaign on behalf of Mossad (the Israeli intelligence service). Western intelligence services and U.S. officials reportedly confirmed the Israeli connection. 

Israel has neither confirmed nor denied its involvement, but Israeli defense minister Moshe Ya'alon said: "We will act in any way and are not willing to tolerate a nuclear-armed Iran. We prefer that this be done by means of sanctions, but in the end, Israel should be able to defend itself." The assassination campaign was reportedly terminated in 2013 following diplomatic pressure from the United States, which was attempting to negotiate restrictions on Iran's nuclear activities.

According to NBC, two US senior officials confirmed that the People's Mujahedin of Iran (MEK) was "financed, trained, and armed by Israel" in killing Iranian nuclear scientists, although a Senior State Department Official later denied saying the MEK was involved in the assassinations of Iranian nuclear scientists. 

According to the private American intelligence agency Stratfor, a fifth Iranian scientist was poisoned by Mossad in 2007.

Timeline

Events

Ardeshir Hosseinpour (15 January 2007)
Ardeshir Hosseinpour was initially reported to have died of "gas poisoning from a faulty heater. " Later reports indicated foul play. American, private, intelligence company Stratfor released a report on 2 February 2007 in which the claim was made, based on "sources very close to Israeli intelligence," that the victim was "in fact a long-time Mossad target."

In 2014, Ardeshir's sister, Mahboobeh Hosseinpour, interviewed from Turkey in a conversation arranged by "The New Iran" opposition group, claimed that her brother was murdered by Iran's Revolutionary Guards rather than by Israel, for refusing to participate in "Iran's nuclear enrichment program whose use was for atomic [weapons] purposes." According to Stratfor, Hosseinpour died of radiation poisoning.

Masoud Alimohammadi (12 January 2010)
At 7:58 am "a remote-controlled bomb attached to a motorcycle", parked near the car of Masoud Alimohammadi, exploded as he left his home in the Gheytariyeh neighbourhood of northern Tehran to go to a university. Windows of houses around the scientist's home were shattered by the force of the blast, and two more people were reportedly injured. According to the BBC, the jolt made neighbors think that an earthquake had struck.

The assassination was reportedly carried out by Majid Jamali Fashi, who stated in a televised confession, confirmed as genuine by Western intelligence officials, that he'd acted on the instructions of Mossad and had been trained in Tel Aviv. "I woke up at 4 and made a call, the plan had not changed. I parked the motorbike near the tree," Fashi said in his confession. Alimohammadi's wife said, "I heard the explosion just when I closed the door."

According to Maziyar Ebrahimi, an alleged perpetrator code-named Amiryal, three teams were involved in the Alimohammadi assassination. "Some of them were on their cars watching the situation and covering the area and I was in my car in a further place from the incident place waiting to take them away after the explosion was done," Ebrahimi reportedly said under interrogation. Maziyar Ebrahimi was later exonerated and explained eight years later how he was proved to be innocent in an interview. "They told me that he was getting out of the parking lot and I pressed the remote button when I saw him, and moved toward the car waiting for me in the alley. Then we moved away," said Arash Kerhadkish (code-named Farshid, Behzad, and Aran) under interrogation, as reported by the Mehr News Agency.

Majid Shahriari (29 November 2010)

Majid Shahriari, a professor at Shahid Beheshti University was killed by a bomb launched from a motorbike. The assassins had attached a carbomb, detonating it from a distance. Shariari's wife, Ghasemi, was a passenger in the car and was injured in the explosion.

"I attached the bomb to the right front door and moved away quickly," said Arash Kerhadkish, who was convicted of assassinating Shahriari. One member of the assassination team was knocked from his motorcycle by the force of the blast. "The motorcycle fell down and one of the riders was injured. We helped him," said Maryam Izadi, a convicted member of the team, under interrogation.

In an almost simultaneous bomb attack, Fereydoon Abbasi, a professor at Shahid Beheshti University, where Shahriari also taught, and his wife were injured. "I had a meeting with Dr. Shahriari at the early morning. ... The bomb was attached to my car at 7:42. We were around the university square and I heard the sound of something colliding with my car and looked back and saw a motorbike. I concluded that that thing colliding with the car was [a] bomb. I stopped at once and told my wife to get out." According to his wife, Abbasi sustained facial and hand injuries.

Darioush Rezaeinejad (23 July 2011)

Darioush Rezaeinejad was shot five times and killed by motorcycle-riding gunmen in front of his home while he was with his wife after they picked up their daughter from kindergarten. His wife was also wounded in the attack.

The attack was described by an Israeli intelligence interviewed by Der Spiegel as "the first public operation by new Mossad chief Tamir Pardo". Rezaeinejad's wife, Shohreh Pirani, was also wounded in the attack. "I got off quickly and followed the shooter. After running several meters, I realized that they were shooting at me. I fell down and heard the motorcycle go away," she later said.

Initial reports said the gunmen had killed 35-year-old "Darioush Rezaei," a physics professor whose area of expertise was neutron transport, and who was linked to Iran's nuclear program. The victim was subsequently identified as Rezaeinejad, a postgraduate electrical engineering student at Tehran's K.N.Toosi University of Technology, who was expected to defend his thesis and working at a "national security research facility." 

After the assassination, the speaker of Iran's parliament Ali Larijani stated that the United States and Israel had killed Rezaeinejad. The U.S. government, through State Department spokeswoman Victoria Nuland, rejected the accusation."

Mostafa Ahmadi Roshan (11 January 2012)
Mostafa Ahmadi Roshan was assassinated with a "magnetized explosive" attached to the side of his car on his way to work, on the second anniversary of Masoud Alimohammadi's murder at 8:30 am in Shahid Golnabi Street, Seyed Khandan, eastern Tehran. 

According to Western intelligence sources, Ahmadi Roshan was "a victim of Israel's Mossad." "In this location, we reached the car and attached the bomb to the car and the bomb exploded near the white fence," said Arash Kerhadkish, under interrogation, as reported by the Mehr News Agency.

January 2015
Iranian authorities claimed they had thwarted another Mossad attempt to assassinate an Iranian nuclear scientist.

Mohsen Fakhrizadeh-Mahabadi (27 November 2020)

The alleged head of Iran's nuclear weapons program, Mohsen Fakhrizadeh, was assassinated on November 27, 2020. Mohammad Javad Zarif, Iran's foreign minister, suggested that Israel was behind Fakhrizadeh's assassination.

Responsibility 
There has been speculation about the identity of their perpetrators. The Israeli Mossad intelligence service was seen as the most likely candidate. Other suspects included Iranian opposition groups such as MEK, intelligence operatives from Arab countries opposed to the Iranian government, and the United States. A U.S. Department official later affirmed that they never said that the MEK was involved in the assassinations of Iranian nuclear scientists. 

Iran blamed Israel and the U.S. for the assassinations. Secretary of State Hillary Clinton categorically denied any U.S. role in the killings, a denial called "plausible" by analysts given the reported lack of U.S. intelligence assets in Iran. Israel neither confirmed nor denied its role in the killings.

In early 2011 Majid Fashi confessed to the killing of Masoud Alimohammadi on Iranian state television, saying that he had trained for the operation at a Mossad facility near Tel Aviv. Fashi was executed in May 2012. That month, Iranian authorities announced the arrest of another 14 Iranians  eight men and six women  described as an Israeli-trained terror cell responsible for five of the attacks on Iranian scientists. Iran's IRTV Channel 1 broadcast a half-hour documentary, Terror Club, which included "the televised confessions of the 12 suspects allegedly involved in the killings of Ali-Mohammadi, Shahriari, Rezaeinejad, and Roshan, and the attempted killing of Abbasi." According to Time, Western intelligence officials confirmed the cracking of two Mossad-backed espionage rings by Iranian intelligence. Officials in the Obama administration also reportedly confirmed Israeli involvement. According to Dan Raviv, Mossad officials were "pissed off and shocked" to see their intelligence assets paraded on Iranian television. After the arrests, Iran said it was confident it had arrested all those responsible for the attacks. Time said that Iran attempted to retaliate against Israel for the assassinations by launching up to 20 hastily-organized attacks on Israeli diplomatic missions around the world in 2012, none of which were successful.

Israel has never publicly confirmed or denied responsibility for the assassinations, and Israeli officials have expressed readiness to employ all necessary means in the nation's defence. Israeli defence minister Moshe Ya'alon said in an interview with Der Spiegel, "Ultimately it is very clear, one way or another, Iran's military nuclear programme must be stopped ... We will act in any way and are not willing to tolerate a nuclear-armed Iran. We prefer that this be done by means of sanctions, but in the end, Israel should be able to defend itself." Ya'alon added that he was not responsible "for the life expectancy of Iranian scientists."

The assassination campaign against Iranian nuclear scientists reportedly ended in 2013 following pressure on Israel from the Obama administration to stop the attacks during negotiations with Iran to restrict its nuclear programme. Mossad officials also reportedly concluded that the attacks were "too dangerous" for valuable intelligence operatives in Iran. The organisation has since reportedly instructed its Iranian spy network to concentrate on finding evidence of Iranian breaches of its nuclear-restriction agreements.

Although Israel is considered responsible for the 2010–2012 assassination campaign against Iranian nuclear scientists, uncertainty surrounds the 2007 death of Iranian scientist Ardeshir Hosseinpour. Hosseinpour was reported by Iranian authorities to have died from gas poisoning caused by a faulty heater, but a six-day delay in their announcement raised suspicions outside Iran. According to Stratfor, Hosseinpour was assassinated by Mossad using radiation poisoning; Iranian officials denied this, calling their scientists "safe." In 2014 Hosseinpours sister, Mahboobeh, accused the Iranian Revolutionary Guard of killing him for his alleged refusal to work on Irans nuclear-enrichment program. Mahboobeh said that she obtained the information from Ardeshirs widow.

Reactions 

The U.S. government condemned the assassinations without implicating any party. However, some American politicians supported the killings. Former speaker of the House Newt Gingrich supported "taking out [Iranian] scientists," and presidential candidate Rick Santorum called the killings "a wonderful thing."

Israel Defense Forces spokesman General Yoav Mordechai said that he had "no idea who targeted [Mostafa Ahmadi Roshan] but I certainly dont shed a tear." Mehdi Hasan wrote in The Guardian,  "These 'men on motorbikes' have been described as 'assassins'. But assassination is just a more-polite word for murder ... How many more of our values will we shred in the name of security? Once we have allowed our governments to order the killing of ... fellow human beings, in secret, without oversight or accountability, what other powers will we dare deny them?"

Historian Michael Burleigh compared the assassinations to the Allied bombing of Nazi V2 rocket sites during World War II, noting that the bombers "were not unduly concerned whether scientists and engineers were killed too, nor foreign slave labourers provided the V2s ceased raining down on London." According to Burleigh, scientists are not abstract researchers; there are "real world" consequences of their actions, and he "shall not shed any tears whenever one of these [Iranian] scientists encounters one of the unforgiving men on motorbikes ... Except that if Israel ventures down this road, I cannot think of much of an argument to prevent Iran following them, and then anyone else who decides to follow."

Paul Koring wrote that the assassinations have reportedly had a "chilling impact" on the Iranian scientific community, making it "more difficult for the regime to recruit anyone [for] national-security research efforts". Koring also wrote that the assassinations, regardless of their effectiveness, "left a real trail of grief". Koring cited Shorheh Pirani, the widow of Darioush Rezaeinejad, who was gunned down in front of his wife and five-year-old daughter. A year after the assassination, he wrote that Armita "still draws pictures of her father. In them, she and her mother always have their mouths open in terrified screams. 'Every day', Mrs. Pirani said, 'she makes that painting. 

Supreme Leader of Iran Ali Khamenei condemned the attacks, saying "the heinous crimes of those who try to suppress the scientific growth of the Iranian nation have been exposed. But there is no doubt that in the face of animosity, Iranian scientists, professors, and researchers will thwart the [enemy's] vicious plans... The martyrdom of these eminent scientists ... has honored the scientific community." Earlier, the leader had stated that "with their achievements, young Iranian scientists have guaranteed the future and long term energy supply for the nation, and such advancements should not be lost at any cost."

Effect
In an interview with Israeli journalist Ronen Bergman, former CIA director Michael Hayden said that the most effective method employed to stop the Iranian nuclear program had been the assassinations of Iranian nuclear scientists. The assassinations eliminated people with valuable knowledge and experience and forced the Iranian government to implement strict security measures such as hunting for Mossad moles, screening equipment for viruses, and assigning bodyguards to scientists, which delayed the program by years, and caused many Iranian scientists to leave the program out of fear that they could be targeted.

See also

 Assassination and terrorism in Iran
 Assassination of Ali Sayyad Shirazi
 Targeted killings by Israel Defense Forces
 Assassination of Mohsen Fakhrizadeh
 2020 Iran explosions
 Gerald Bull

References

Assassination campaigns
Iran–Israel proxy conflict
Iran–Israel relations
Nuclear energy in Iran
Nuclear program of Iran
Politics of Iran
Iranian terrorism victims
Conflicts involving the People's Mojahedin Organization of Iran
People killed in Mossad operations